The National Reform Association was an American radical reformist political organization, founded in 1844 by radicals George Henry Evans, Thomas Ainge Devyr, John Windt and others with the aim of lobbying Congress to pass a wide range of land reforms. The NRA campaigned with the slogan "Vote Yourself a Farm", and the organization managed to achieve a wave of 55,000 petitions from Americans calling on Congress to open up free public lands to homesteaders, which lead to the successful Homestead Act of 1862. 

In his 1846 pamphlet Vote Yourself a Farm, George Henry Evans writes:

After George's death in 1856, the NRA was then managed by his younger brother and Shaker Elder Frederick William Evans. The movement had a stronghold of support in the North-East, especially in the State of New York where large tracts of land were owned by the New Lebanon Shaker Society.

See also 
 Single Tax Movement (1881-Present)

References 

1844 establishments in the United States
Defunct political organizations of the United States
Political organizations established in 1844
Year of disestablishment missing